The 2022–23 Spain Tri-Nation Series was a Twenty20 International (T20I) cricket tournament that was held at the Desert Springs Cricket Ground in Almería from 4 to 6 November 2022. The participating teams were the hosts Spain, along with Germany and Italy.

Squads

Points table

Fixtures

References

Notes

External links
 Series home at ESPNcricinfo

Associate international cricket competitions in 2022–23

2020s in Andalusia
Spain Tri-Nation Series